Gösta Alexandersson, (16 November 1905 – 17 March 1988) was a Swedish actor best known for his roles in Bomans pojke and Friaren från Landsvägen.

Filmography
 Thomas Graal's Ward (1922) - buspojke
 Andersson's Kalle (1922) - Kalle
 Amatörfilmen (1922) - smörgåsnisse
 The Suitor from the Highway (1923) - Gösta Lind
 New Pranks of Andersson's Kalle (1923) - Anderssonskans Kalle
 40 Skipper Street (1925) - Tom
 Boman's Boy (1933) - bagarlärling

References

1988 deaths
1905 births
Male actors from Stockholm
20th-century Swedish male actors
Swedish male stage actors
Swedish male silent film actors
Swedish male film actors